Graham James West (born 21 September 1973), a former Australian politician, was a member of the New South Wales Legislative Assembly for Campbelltown between 2001 and 2011 for the Labor Party.

West was elected Member for Campbelltown at a by-election on 3 February 2001 following the resignation of Labor MP Michael Knight. He was re-elected at the general election in March 2003 and Premier Bob Carr appointed him as Parliamentary Secretary Assisting the Treasurer and Minister for State Development. He was re-elected on 24 March 2007 and was appointed Minister for Gaming and Racing, and Minister for Sport and Recreation.

He was appointed Minister for Juvenile Justice, Minister for Volunteering and Minister for Youth in the New South Wales State Government on 8 September 2008. On 4 June 2010, West announced in Parliament his decision to resign from Cabinet and would not contest the 2011 state election, giving his motivation as a desire to work for communities and organisations in a non-partisan way.

In November 2010 he was appointed as the Chief Executive Officer of the NSW State Council of the St Vincent de Paul Society.
In 2012 he was appointed to the Society's Australia National Council as a vice president and was elected Australian National President in March 2015. He is also a member of the International Council General of the Society, and Chair of the International Finance and Accountability Commission and Concordat.

References

External links
Speeches in Hansard by Graham West
 

1973 births
Living people
Members of the New South Wales Legislative Assembly
University of Wollongong alumni
Australian Labor Party members of the Parliament of New South Wales
21st-century Australian politicians